Micah Lea'alafa (born 1 June 1991) is a Solomon Islands footballer who plays as a midfielder. He plays for FK Beograd.

Career 
After failing to qualify for the 2014-15 OFC Champions League with Solomon Warriors, Lea'alafa moved abroad to Vanuatu to play for OFC Champions League runners-up Amicale.

Following an unsuccessful trial at an unnamed club in Italy, Lea'alafa moved to Oceanian champions Auckland City in 2015. In July 2019 he joined the South African club Maritzburg United. He was released by the club in February 2020.

Internationally, Lea'alafa made his debut for the Solomon Islands national team on March 24, 2016 in their 2–0 victory against Papua New Guinea. He also plays for the Solomon Islands national futsal team.

It was reported on February 25, 2023 that the player made his debut for FK Beograd.

International goals 

Scores and results list the Solomon Islands' goal tally first.

Honours

Club
Auckland City
 OFC Champions League: 2015–16,2016-17

Individual
 2015–16 OFC Champions League Golden Ball

References

External links

 

Living people
1991 births
Association football midfielders
Futsal forwards
Solomon Islands international footballers
Solomon Islands footballers
Solomon Islands expatriates in New Zealand
Solomon Warriors F.C. players
Amicale F.C. players
Auckland City FC players
Maritzburg United F.C. players
South African Premier Division players
New Zealand Football Championship players
People from the Central Province (Solomon Islands)
Expatriate association footballers in New Zealand
Expatriate soccer players in South Africa
Solomon Islands men's futsal players